George Miller (born 22 November 1980) is a Liberian former footballer who played at both professional and international levels as a striker.

Career
Born in Tripoli, Libya, Miller played club football in Portugal, Ireland and Liberia for Braga, St Patrick's Athletic, Crumlin United and Mighty Barrolle.

He also earned four caps for the Liberian national side, three of which came in FIFA World Cup qualifying matches.

References

1980 births
Living people
Liberian footballers
Liberia international footballers
Association football forwards
St Patrick's Athletic F.C. players
Crumlin United F.C. players
Expatriate association footballers in the Republic of Ireland